El Molino River (Rio El Molino) is the name of two medium streams in El Salvador.  
, near the Jiquilisco Bay in Usulután District.  

, near the city of Ahuachapán in Ahuachapán District.

Both streams have at least large to moderate quantities of fresh water year round, especially from early May through October.

References

Rivers of El Salvador